Matuganti is an Embera village in Darién Province, Panama.  Far from any roads, it is located along the upper reaches of the Tuira River, close to the Colombia–Panama border.

References

Populated places in Darién Province
Road-inaccessible communities of Panama